CSHQA is a full-service design firm in the western United States specializing in architecture, engineering and planning. Established  in 1889 in Boise, Idaho, CSHQA is now one of the northwest's architectural and engineering firms, with projects nationwide.

History 
CSHQA began in 1889 as a one-man, one-room office when William S. Campbell, a Scotsman educated at the School of Architecture in Edinburgh, moved to Boise to practice architecture.

As years passed and more architects joined the firm, the name changed to reflect the additional partners. In 1979, it was known as Cline Smull Hamill Quintieri Associates and in 1985 it was shortened to CSHQA.

Innovation and sustainable design 
CSHQA has been a leader in energy efficiency since the 1970s, receiving recognition for Boise's Amity Elementary School, which appeared on a 1979 cover of Time for its forward-thinking design. Solar panels and other energy-efficient elements were also included in the design.

In 1985, the firm received international acclaim for building the energy-efficient Liberty Elementary School in Boise introduced energy-saving concepts such as solar energy and controllable electronics that took advantage of daylighting. The revolutionary design also entailed berming the earth up to the window sills to conserve energy needed for heating and cooling the building.

CSHQA began membership in the U.S. Green Building Council in 2001. There have been 8 LEED certified projects and 13 LEED registered projects with certification levels from certified to platinum as of 2013.  Notably, the Mulvaney Medical Office building, completed 2009, and the Ada County Civic Plaza tenant improvement project have both recently received LEED Gold.

CSHQA has designed 6 Whole Foods Markets which have been awarded Green Globes by the Green Building Initiative.

Offices

 200 Broad St, Boise, Idaho 83702
 701 University Ave, Ste 210, Sacramento, California 95825
 2696 S Colorado Blvd, Ste 525, Denver, Colorado 80222
CSHQA</ref>

Selected projects

 Idanha Hotel, Boise, ID
 Boise Art Museum expansion
 Morrison-Knudsen world headquarters, Boise, ID
 Kibbie Dome, University of Idaho, Moscow, ID 
 Boise State University Pavilion, Boise, ID 
 C-130 hangars, Idaho Air National Guard, Boise, ID
 C.W. Moore Plaza, Boise, ID
 Boise Airport terminal expansion, Boise, ID

 Rogue Valley International–Medford Airport terminal, Medford, OR
 Grant County Regional Airport terminal, John Day, OR
 Fresno Yosemite International Airport terminal expansion, Fresno, CA
 Lithia Motors, Idaho, Texas, Alaska, South Dakota
 Idaho State Capitol renovation, Boise, IDReceived AIA Northwest & Pacific Region Merit Award 2011 
 New/remodeled K-12 schools for Nampa School District
 Tamarack Resort Discovery Center, Donnelly, ID

References

External links
 CSHQA Architecture, Engineering, Planning, Boise Idaho

Architecture firms based in Idaho
Design companies established in 1889
Companies based in Idaho
1889 establishments in Idaho Territory